Tack Lee Brook is a watercourse in Greater Manchester and a tributary of the River Roch.

Birtle Brook is one of its tributaries.

Rivers of the Metropolitan Borough of Rochdale
Rivers of Greater Manchester
1